Waxberry is a common name for several plants and may refer to:

 Gaultheria appressa, from Australia
 Myrica pensylvanica, from eastern North America
 Pollichia campestris, from eastern Africa and Arabia
 Symphoricarpos, a genus of the honeysuckle family

The name "waxberry" is also a common mistranslation to the Chinese fruit, Yangmei (杨梅) or Myrica rubra.